Zari (Zariwa) is a Chadic dialect cluster of Nigeria. Blench (2019) lists varieties as Zari, Zakshi, and Boto.

Although there is an ethnic population of about 20,000, the last speaker had already died by 2000 (Campbell and Belew 2018).

References

Chadic languages